Mark Agar (born 2 September 1948) is a British bobsledder. He competed in the two man and the four man bobsleigh events at the 1976 Winter Olympics in Innsbruck, Austria.

References

1948 births
Living people
British male bobsledders
Olympic bobsledders of Great Britain
Bobsledders at the 1976 Winter Olympics
Sportspeople from London